Navansar (also Romanized as Navānsar; also known as Narvansar and Navāsar) is a village in Dikleh Rural District, Hurand District, Ahar County, East Azerbaijan Province, Iran. At the 2006 census, its population was 466, in 95 families.

References 

Populated places in Ahar County